The Basilique Marie-Reine-des-Apôtres (Mary Queen of the Apostles Basilica) is a Roman Catholic basilica dedicated to the Blessed Virgin Mary located in Yaoundé, Cameroon.  The basilica is under the circumscription of the Archdiocese of Yaoundé. The basilica is built on the site of the first church built by the Missionaries of the Holy Spirit in Cameroon. The church was dedicated on March 2, 2006.

References

Basilica churches in Africa
Buildings and structures in Yaoundé
20th-century Roman Catholic church buildings in Cameroon
21st-century Roman Catholic church buildings